Febres Cordero may refer to:
Georgina Febres-Cordero (1861–1925), Venezuelan nun
León Febres Cordero (1931–2008), president of Ecuador
Miguel Febres Cordero (1854–1910), a saint in the Roman Catholic Church